Anup Kumar Paul (born 1986) is an English singer-songwriter and producer from London. A. K. Paul came to prominence in 2011 as a contributor to brother Jai Paul's debut single "BTSTU (Edit)". The following year Paul also worked on Jai Paul's "Jasmine (demo)" and "Higher Res" as well as co-writing for artists Sam Smith and Emeli Sandé, resulting in winning an Ivor Novello Award in 2013.

A. K. Paul, Jai Paul, and Muz Azar announced a new project called Paul Institute in 2016. Paul released "Landcruisin'", his first solo record, via the platform.

Music career

2007–2011
Paul is credited as providing additional vocals and sound design on brother Jai Paul's demo recording "BTSTU", as well as mastering the track. The demo received widespread blog coverage throughout 2010, leading to significant UK national radio play. In 2011, Jai Paul's record label XL Recordings gave the demo an official release as "BTSTU (Edit)" to favourable reviews.

2012
Paul is credited as providing bass guitar and sound design for Jai Paul's 2012 release, "Jasmine (demo)". He also mastered the track, as with Jai Paul's debut release. "Jasmine (demo)" received critical acclaim in the media, with Pitchfork featuring the song as a "Best New Track" within an hour of its appearance on SoundCloud, The New York Times praising its "Prince era sensuality" and The Guardian describing the production as "amazing." The song appears on the soundtrack to the 2013 video game, Grand Theft Auto V.

2014
Paul collaborated with Hackney vocalist Nao on a song called "So Good". This was the first time Paul applied the moniker A. K. Paul.

In November, Miguel posted a photo of himself with A. K. Paul and his brother Jai Paul on Instagram, marking a rare appearance from both artists.

Also in November, singer Jones collaborated with A. K. on a song called "You". "It’s significantly more dialed-down and intimate when compared to “So Good”, but every bit as captivating. Jones’ voice is both airy and striking, flowing over Paul's warm backdrop of crystalline synths and steady percussions".

2015
A. K. returned with another production credit. This time on Miguel's album Wildheart for the song "Flesh".

2016
In March 2016, A. K. and his brother Jai, along with Muz Azar announced the founding of the Paul Institute.  This was accompanied by the release of the single "Landcruisin'", a song by A. K. Paul, via text messages and a website.

"Landcruisin'" is the first release from Paul Institute. The song premiered on Zane Lowe's Beats 1 radio show before receiving digital, streaming, and 7-inch vinyl releases. Most music critics gave the song favorable reviews, comparing it to the works of Prince, D'Angelo, and Miguel, saying it matched expectations. It managed to enter the Billboard Twitter Emerging Artists chart.

James Vincent McMorrow reached out to A. K. Paul after listening to "Landcruisin'", calling it "a huge record". James asked Anup to put his own twist on the lead single from We Move, "Rising Water". The result was something extraordinary, James wrote in a statement to Complex. "He said to me after it was done that he's never done something like this before, lifted an entire vocal from an already written and produced song and then flipped the chord structure and premise of the song."

2017
Paul collaborated with Guernsey born DJ Mura Masa with the track "Who Is It Gonna B" on Mura Masa's debut album. A. K. Paul also reached out to British R&B artist HIRA - working on production on the single "Eve" alongside Craze and Hoax. 2017 also saw the introduction of a new A. K. Paul demo track entitled 'Be Honest' which was aired on an Apple Beats 1 broadcast of a live Mura Masa performance and DJ set.

2020 
After a period of inactivity attributed to a legal fight, Paul released the final version of 'Be Honest' in July 2020.

Discography

References

1985 births
Living people
English male singer-songwriters
English record producers
English multi-instrumentalists
English electronic musicians
English pop singers
English people of Indian descent